In Bulgaria the driving licence ( (Certificate for driving a motorized vehicle), abbreviated СУМПС) is a governmental right given to those who request a license for any of the categories they desire. It is required for every type of motorized vehicle. The minimum age to obtain a driving license is: 16 years for a motorcycle, 18 years for a car, and 21 years for buses and cargo vehicles.

In addition to the plastic card, each holder of a Bulgarian driving licence is in possession of a second document, named control card (контролен талон). It is made of blue paper, is filled in by hand and is stamped. When a driver is fined for road violation, the counterfoil is taken by the authorities and is replaced by а breach act (акт за нарушение). The driver may continue driving for a limited period of time, stated in the document. The check counterfoil is returned only after the fine is paid.

Since 1999, the Bulgarian driving license format was changed from that of a pink booklet to a credit-card sized card.

Obtaining a driver's licence

The Bulgarian driving licence can be obtained after finishing a driving school and passing a two-stage test, the theory test and road test. A first aid course for drivers and a primary school diploma is also required to obtain valid driver's licence. A medical certificate by a GP is also necessary.

Gallery of historic images

See also
European driving licence
Vehicle registration plates of Bulgaria
Vehicle registration plates of the European Union
Bulgarian identity card
Bulgarian passport

External links
 Bulgarian road legislation

Bulgaria
Road transport in Bulgaria